John Chea Jaysay (born 27 November 1999) is a Liberian footballer who plays as a midfielder for FC Bea Mountain. He made two appearances for the Liberia national team in 2017.

Club career
Jaysay joined Liberian Premier League side Keitrace FC for the 2013–14 season. He left and joined FC Fassell during the 2016–17 Liberian First Division League season.

He joined Barrack Young Controllers on a season-long deal in 2018.

In January 2019, he joined newly promoted Liberian Premier League club Bea Mountain on a two-year deal.

International career
Jaysay has represented the Liberian under-20 team.

He made his international senior debut for Liberia in a 2018 African Nations Championship qualification qualifying match against Mauritania on 16 July 2017.

References

External links 
 

1999 births
Living people
Sportspeople from Monrovia
Liberian footballers
Association football midfielders
Liberia under-20 international footballers
Barrack Young Controllers FC players